The Church of Jesus Christ of Latter-day Saints in California refers to the Church of Jesus Christ of Latter-day Saints (LDS Church) and its members in California. California has the 2nd most members of the LDS Church in the United States, behind Utah. The LDS Church is the 2nd largest denomination in California, behind the Roman Catholic Church.

History

Brooklyn Saints

A Mormon immigrant company, under direction of Samuel Brannon, departed on the ship Brooklyn from New York on February 4, 1846 en route to the Great Salt Lake Valley via California.  The group under the direction of Brannan navigated around Cape Horn and arrived at Yerba Buena on July 31, 1846.  The company of around 230 people were the first known Latter-day Saints to set foot in California.  Their numbers nearly tripled the population of the small town of Yerba Buena, later renamed San Francisco.  While there, Brannan and other church members began publication of one of California's first English-language newspapers, the California Star, in October 1846.  One of the Brooklyn saints, Angeline Lovett, set up a school in the old Franciscan Dolores Mission, the first English-language school in California.

During the early autumn of 1846, Brannan led 20 men to the San Joaquin Valley where they founded a Mormon farming village named New Hope Colony.  It soon failed as heavy seasonal storms flooded the valley, destroying their crops.  Most of the Brooklyn saints left California for Salt Lake City in 1848.

Mormon Battalion and California Gold Rush

In January 1847, the Mormon Battalion arrived in San Diego.  Battalion members helped construct a number of building and public works in San Diego.  They then traveled to Los Angeles where they built a fort and raised the first American flag in California.  Six discharged battalion members were at Sutter's Mill in northern California when gold was discovered there on January 24, 1848. On their way, they carved an emigrant road that would be used by thousands of westward bound travelers including the gold rush "Forty-Niners."

In February 1856, George Q. Cannon began publication in San Francisco of the Western Standard, a weekly periodical supportive of the church.

San Bernardino LDS colony
Main: History of San Bernardino, California: Mormon San Bernardino

The first colonization from Utah to California came in 1851 when a company of about 450 saints and slaves under direction of Amasa M. Lyman and Charles C. Rich of the Quorum of the Twelve Apostles settled at what is now San Bernardino.  The colony was the final settlement in a string of Mormon communities extending  from Salt Lake City in an area known as Deseret.  The community thrived, and on July 6, 1851, the San Bernardino Stake, California's first, was organized.  The colony was dissolved by the church at the advance of Johnston's Army toward Salt Lake City in 1857.  Brigham Young instructed the settlers to return to Utah to colonize.  About 1,400 (fewer than half) returned to Utah at the request of the church.  The San Bernardino Stake was dissolved in 1857 as well as the ecclesiastical units within the stake.

Significant church growth and history 1895-1990

The Los Angeles Branch was created on March 21, 1895.  In 1896, the Northern California and Southern California conferences were organized.  The Sacramento Conference was added in 1898.  Most missionary work around the turn of the century took place in larger population centers.

On January 21, 1923, the Los Angeles Stake became the first to be created in the state since the San Bernardino Stake had been dissolved.   The Los Angeles Stake was divided on May 22, 1927 to form the Los Angeles and Hollywood stakes.   On July 10, 1927, the San Francisco Stake was established.

On February 18, 1939, 1,400 people visited the church's exhibit at the opening day of the Golden Gate International Exposition in San Francisco.  This exhibit was a visitors' center portraying a reduced-size Salt Lake Tabernacle.

Eight more stakes were created in the 1930s, five in the 1940s, and 30 in the 1950s.  The completion of the Los Angeles and Oakland temples soon followed.

In 1980, church president Spencer W. Kimball spoke to members in the Los Angeles area in the Rose Bowl, with an estimated 75,000 in attendance.

Recent history 1990-present

At the beginning of the year 2000, California had 17 missions, more than any other state in the United States. In the state's major cities, many minority converts were taught and baptized in their native language. With a significant immigration to California from Latin America, five Spanish-speaking stakes have been organized. Various Asian and Polynesian wards function as well, and a Tongan stake was created in San Francisco in 1992. There are currently more than 200 ethnic wards and branches in California.

Church president Gordon B. Hinckley attended the rededication of the historic Hollywood (now Los Angeles California) Stake Center on June 8, 2003.

Historical reenactments

In July 1996, the sesquicentennial of the arrival of the ship Brooklyn was celebrated through reenactment of the event on a replica ship that sailed into the San Francisco Bay.  Church members throughout the state commemorated the anniversary with observances that included an exhibit at the San Francisco Maritime Museum, performances of the Mormon Tabernacle Choir at the Davies Symphony Hall, dedications of plaques honoring the early settlers, and pioneer activities and parades.

In addition to commemorating the arrival of early Latter-day Saint settlers, as well as contributions to the development of the state, members throughout California donated many hours of service in community projects sponsored by wards and stakes, including gathering supplies and food for the needy; cleaning parks, beaches and roadways; painting and repairing homeless shelters, and cleaning up graffiti.

On January 18, 1997, 2,400 church members re-enacted the arrival of the Mormon Battalion in California 150 years earlier.  Other Mormon Battalion celebrations along the coast followed on respective anniversaries.   On March 6, 1997, Hinckley spoke to a record audience of the Los Angeles World Affairs Council, and on March 19, he addressed the World Forum of Silicon Valley.  He also spoke at various church events during the year.  A church-produced video depicting the discovery of gold at Sutter's Mill was donated to the state of California to be shown continuously at Marshall Gold Discovery State Park in Coloma.

Membership history

Membership growth has slowed in California since 1991 due to significant out-migration of members.

Disaster relief and humanitarian aid
In times of disasters, such as earthquakes, fires, and floods, church members in California have donated countless hours of service, helping communities to recover.

In 1997, members in San Diego donated some 40-50 tons of food to eight community agencies for the homeless and needy.

In May 2003, hundreds of Los Angeles-area Muslims and members of the Pasadena California Stake joined in preparing emergency supplies for Iraqi families.  With conflicts of the war with Iraq completed, a humanitarian aid day was set for May 10, 2003, where hygiene kits for some 10,000 families were completed and added to a $650,000 shipment of medical supplies and blankets donated by the church.

Moral issues
Church members in the state have also taken leadership roles in moral issues, such as combating pornography and have cooperated with other congregations of various interfaith endeavors.   Members have been active in other moral issues including abortion, gambling, drug and alcohol abuse, and marriage.

County statistics

List of LDS Church adherents in each county as of 2010 according to the Association of Religion Data Archives: Note: Each county adherent count reflects meetinghouse location of congregation and not by location of residence. Census count reflects location of residence which may skew percent of population in locations where adherents reside in a different county as their congregational meetinghouse.

Missions
The California Mission was opened on July 31, 1846 with Samuel Brannan as president.  It was discontinued in 1858 due to the Utah War, but later reopened in 1892 with Luther Dalton, who began missionary labors in San Francisco and Oakland. In 1894, Karl G. Maeser relocated to California to direct the Utah exhibit in the state's mid-winter fair and to serve as president of the California Mission.

Notes
 California Anaheim Mission - The California South Mission was renamed the California Anaheim Mission on June 20, 1974.
 California Arcadia Mission - On June 20, 1974, the California East Mission was renamed California Arcadia Mission.
 California Los Angeles Mission - The California Mission was renamed the California Los Angeles Mission on June 20, 1974.
 California Newport Beach Mission - The California Carlsbad Mission was realigned and renamed the California Newport Beach Mission on July 1, 2019.
 California Oakland Mission - On June 20, 1974, the California Central Mission was renamed California Oakland Mission.  On July 1, 2009, it was renamed the California Oakland/San Francisco Mission after consolidation with the California San Francisco Mission.
 California San Francisco Mission - On July 1, 1997, the California San Francisco Mission was created. On July 1, 2009, it was consolidated into the California Oakland Mission.  The resulting mission was named the California Oakland/San Francisco Mission.
 California Sacramento Mission - On January 2, 1942, the Northern California Mission was organized. It was renamed to the California North mission on July 15, 1966, and ultimately renamed the California Sacramento Mission on June 20, 1974.

In addition to these missions, much of North California, East of the Sierra Nevada Mountains are located in the Nevada Reno Mission.

Temples

California currently has 7 temples in operation and 3 additional temples announced or under construction.

See also

 Religion in California
 Mormon Corridor
 The Church of Jesus Christ of Latter-day Saints membership statistics (United States)

References

Further reading

  Based on the author's 

 Based on the author's

External links
 Newsroom Facts and Statistics (California)
 ComeUntoChrist.org Latter-day Saints Visitor site
 The Church of Jesus Christ of Latter-day Saints Official site

Church of Jesus Christ of Latter-day Saints